F17 or F-17 may refer to:

 Formula 17, a 2004 Taiwanese film
 ECAN F17, a French wire-guided torpedo
 F 17 Kallinge, an air force base in southern Sweden 
 JF-17 Thunder, a fighter aircraft built by China and Pakistan
 Northrop YF-17, an American prototype fighter aircraft of the 1970s
 For the F17 Bandy World Championship, see Bandy World Championship G-17
 Fluorine-17 (F-17 or 17F), an isotope of fluorine

See also

 
 
 f (disambiguation)
 17 (disambiguation)
 17f (disambiguation)